Culebra River may refer to:

Culebra River (Aguada, Puerto Rico)
Culebra River (Orocovis, Puerto Rico)